Carlos Erwin Arias Égüez (born 27 April 1980 in Portachuelo, Santa Cruz) is a Bolivian goalkeeper who most recently played for Sport Boys Warnes.

Club career
On 4 July 2010, Arias signed a 3-seasons' contract with Israeli Maccabi Netanya, due to his 20-game suspension in Bolivia.

On 4 August 2011, Arias signed for Spanish Segunda side Córdoba CF.

National team
Arias has been capped for Bolivia in 41 games. Among the most important tournaments he has participated in is the Copa América 2001 and more recently Copa América 2011.

Honours
Blooming
Bolivian League: 1998, 1999

The Strongest
Bolivian League: 2003 (A), 2003 (C)

Bolívar
Bolivian League: 2009 (A)

Individual
Sport 5 Goalkeeper of the Season: 2010–11

References

External links

1980 births
Living people
2001 Copa América players
2011 Copa América players
Association football goalkeepers
Bolivian expatriate footballers
Bolivian footballers
Bolivia international footballers
Club Blooming players
Club Bolívar players
Córdoba CF players
Club Deportivo Guabirá managers
Expatriate footballers in Israel
Expatriate footballers in Spain
Israeli Premier League players
Maccabi Netanya F.C. players
Oriente Petrolero players
People from Sara Province
The Strongest players